A molcajete (Mexican Spanish, from Nahuatl molcaxitl) and tejolote are stone tools, the traditional Mexican version of the mortar and pestle, similar to the South American batan, used for grinding various food products.

Description

The molcajete was used by pre-Hispanic Mesoamerican cultures, including the Aztec and Maya, stretching back several thousand years. Traditionally carved out of a single block of vesicular basalt, molcajetes are typically round in shape and supported by three short legs. They are frequently decorated with the carved head of an animal on the outside edge of the bowl, giving the molcajete the appearance of a short, stout, three-legged animal. The pig is the most common animal head used for decoration of this type.

In the pre-Hispanic Mesoamerican period, the molcajete had a lid and the set was believed to be used for burial of members in society of high status. Additionally, throughout the pre-Hispanic Mesoamerican period, they were decorated with various colors and designs, and orange wares were identified as the most common characteristic of the molcajete.  The matching hand-held grinding tool, known as a tejolote (Mexican Spanish, from Nahuatl texolotl), is made of the same basalt material.

Use and care

Molcajetes are used to crush and grind spices, and to prepare salsas and guacamole. The rough surface of the basalt stone creates a superb grinding surface that maintains itself over time as tiny bubbles in the basalt are ground down, replenishing the textured surface.

A new basalt molcajete needs to be "broken in" because small grains of basalt can be loosened from the surface when it is first used and this will give an unpleasant gritty texture to the first few items prepared in it. A simple way to do the initial "seasoning" is to grind uncooked white rice in the molcajete, a handful at a time. When the white rice flour has no visible grains of basalt in it, the molcajete is ready to use. Some rice flour may remain ground into the surface of the molcajete, but this causes no problems.

As the porous basalt is impossible to fully clean and sanitize, molcajetes are known to "season" (much like cast iron skillets), carrying over flavors from one preparation to another. Salsas and guacamole prepared in molcajetes are known to have a distinctive texture, and some also carry a subtle difference in flavor, from those prepared in blenders. Molcajetes can also be used as a cooking tool, where it is heated to a high temperature using an open fire or hot coals, and then used to heat its food contents. Although true molcajetes are made of basalt, imitations are sometimes made of a mixture of pressed concrete and volcanic rock particles.

Molcajetes are also used as dish service in restaurants and homes. While recipes are usually not stewed or otherwise cooked in them, the molcajete stays hot for a very long time due to its high thermal mass, and it is not unusual for a dish to still be bubbling half an hour after serving.

Gallery

See also
 Batan
 Metate
 Mortar and pestle
 Oralu kallu

Footnotes

References

  
  
 

Mexican food preparation utensils
Food grinding tools
Lithics
Mesoamerican cuisine
Mexican cuisine
Mesoamerican artifacts